Carnival Scenes (literally, "Why the bells are ringing, Mitică?") is a 1981 Romanian drama film directed by Lucian Pintilie. It was banned in Romania and was not shown until after the 1989 revolution. The film was selected as the Romanian entry for the Best Foreign Language Film at the 63rd Academy Awards, but was not accepted as a nominee.

Cast
 Victor Rebengiuc as Pampon
  as Mița Baston
  (as Crăcănel)
 Tora Vasilescu as Didina Mazu
 Gheorghe Dinică as Nae
 Mircea Diaconu as Iordache
 Ștefan Bănică
 Tamara Buciuceanu

See also
 List of submissions to the 63rd Academy Awards for Best Foreign Language Film
 List of Romanian submissions for the Academy Award for Best Foreign Language Film

References

External links
 

1981 films
1981 drama films
Romanian drama films
1980s Romanian-language films
Films directed by Lucian Pintilie
Film controversies in Romania